Frank Kusch is a  historian of American history, who writes on post-1945 political and cultural events. Kusch is the author of Battleground Chicago: the Police and the 1968 Democratic National Convention (September, 2004) and All American Boys: Draft Dodgers in Canada from the Vietnam War (August, 2001).

Kusch has served as an editor and copy editor for publishing houses, newspapers, magazines, including government and civic publications. He has also worked as a media and communications consultant, including speechwriting for federal and provincial politicians in Canada. Kusch has earned a Ph.D from the University of Saskatchewan in Saskatoon, Saskatchewan, Canada, and a Master's Degree from Ohio University in Athens, Ohio. Kusch works in Teaching, Learning, and Student Experience, with the University of Saskatchewan. Kusch is completing a book on Richard Nixon and the 1972 United States presidential election in 2022.

Publications

Battleground Chicago: the Police and the 1968 Democratic National Convention (September, 2004).  An excerpt from the book. a review of the book.
All American Boys: Draft Dodgers in Canada from the Vietnam War (August, 2001)

1959 births
University of Saskatchewan alumni
Living people
21st-century American historians
21st-century American male writers
American male non-fiction writers